Norsholm is a locality situated in Norrköping Municipality, Östergötland County, Sweden with 615 inhabitants in 2010. It lies around 15  kilometres southwest of Norrköping.

Norsholm lies on the E4 and Göta kanal. There are not many work places in the town, and most commute to Norrköping or Linköping.

References

External links
Norsholm

Populated places in Östergötland County
Populated places in Norrköping Municipality